George Vansittart (15 September 1745 – 31 January 1825) was a British politician.

He was the younger son of Arthur Vansittart of Shottesbrook and educated at Reading school. His brothers Arthur Vansittart and Henry Vansittart were also MPs.

He made his fortune as a merchant in British India and settled at Bisham Abbey on his return to England in 1776. He was the Member of Parliament (MP) for Berkshire from 1784 to 1812.

Vansittart married Sarah, daughter of Sir James Stonhouse, 11th Baronet, with whom he had 5 sons and 3 daughters. General George Henry Vansittart and Vice-Admiral Henry Vansittart (1777–1843) were their sons.

References 

1745 births
1825 deaths
Members of the Parliament of Great Britain for Berkshire
British MPs 1784–1790
British MPs 1790–1796
British MPs 1796–1800
Members of the Parliament of the United Kingdom for Berkshire
UK MPs 1801–1802
UK MPs 1802–1806
UK MPs 1806–1807
UK MPs 1807–1812